Ismaʻīl Rājī al-Fārūqī ( January 1, 1921 – May 27, 1986) was a  Palestinian-American philosopher. He spent several years at Al-Azhar University in Cairo, then taught at several universities in North America, including McGill University in Montreal. He was Professor of Religion at Temple University, where he founded and chaired the Islamic Studies program. Al-Faruqi was also the founder of the International Institute of Islamic Thought. He wrote over 100 articles for various scholarly journals and magazines in addition to 25 books, of the most notable being Christian Ethics: A Historical and Systematic Analysis of Its Dominant Ideas. He also established the Islamic Studies Group of the American Academy of Religion and chaired it for ten years. He served as the vice-president of the Inter-Religious Peace Colloquium, The Muslim-Jewish-Christian Conference and as the president of the American Islamic College in Chicago.

Early life and education
Al-Faruqi was born in Jaffa, in British-mandate Palestine. His father, 'Abd al-Huda al-Faruqi, was an Islamic judge (qadi) and a religious man well-versed in Islamic scholarship. Faruqi received his religious education at home from his father and in the local mosque. He began to attend the French Dominican Collège des Frères de Jaffa in 1936.

His first appointment was as a registrar of cooperative societies (1942) under the British Mandate government in Jerusalem, which appointed him in 1945 the district governor of Galilee. Subsequent to the partition plan of Palestine, and the creation of the independent Jewish state of Israel in 1948, al-Faruqi at first emigrated to Beirut, Lebanon, where he studied at the American University of Beirut, then enrolled the next year at Indiana University's Graduate School of Arts and Sciences, obtaining his M.A. in philosophy in 1949. He was then accepted for entry into Harvard University's department of philosophy and was awarded his second M.A. in philosophy there in March 1951, with a thesis entitled Justifying the Good: Metaphysics and Epistemology of Value (1952).

His dissertation was deeply influenced by the phenomenology of Max Scheler (1874–1928), particularly the latter's notion of axiological intuitionism. Al-Faruqi argued that Scheler's axiological intuitionism privileged feeling as knowing, thus recognizing the logic of the heart as an a priori emotional intuition of value. Such recognition could justify carving out a conceptual as well as practical space for the emergence of a critique of post-Enlightenment Reason from the standpoint of a non-Western philosopher. However, he decided to return to Indiana University; he submitted his thesis to the Department of Philosophy and received his PhD in September 1952. By then he had a background in classical philosophy and the developing thought of the western tradition. At the beginning of 1953, he and his wife were in Syria. He then moved to Egypt, where he studied at Al-Azhar University (1954–1958) again with a view to acquiring another PhD.

In 1958, al-Faruqi was offered a position as a visiting fellow at the Faculty of Divinity at McGill University in Canada. During his two-year tenure at McGill, he studied Christian theology and Judaism, and became acquainted with the famous Pakistani Muslim philosopher Fazlur Rahman. During these years, al-Faruqi was preoccupied with his anti-Zionist Arab identity. Rahman reminisced in 1986 that al-Faruqi's blunt anti-Zionism and his refusal to play the detached scholar "frightened" his McGill colleagues. Although he was soft-spoken with unfailing smiles, at McGill he was considered to be, in Rahman's words, "an angry young Muslim Palestinian". In order to challenge al-Faruqi's Arabocentric views of Islam, and to broaden his scope of understanding the ummah, in 1961, Rahman arranged a two-year appointment for him in Pakistan at the Central Institute of Islamic Research. Rahman intended to expose al-Faruqi to the cultural diversity of Muslims and their contributions to Islam. "Except", Rahman (1986) later recalled, "it was his Arabism which drew a great deal of fire both inside and outside the Institute, as well as his academic preference for Cairo".

From Arabism to Islamism

In 1963, after returning to the United States, he was hired as a visiting professor at the University of Chicago's Divinity School. Between 1964 and 1968, al-Faruqi established himself as an associate professor at the Department of Religion at Syracuse University, where he initiated its programme in Islamic Studies. In 1968, he accepted a position at Temple University as a professor of religion, where he also founded the Islamic Studies Programme. He held that position until his death in 1986.

Much of al-Faruqi's early thought is associated with what he called urubah (Arabism). In his 1962 book, On Arabism: Urubah and Religion, he argued that urubah comprises the core identity and set of values which embrace all Muslims, a single community of believers (ummah). Al-Faruqi formulated the notion of urubah in contradistinction to two other hegemonic ideologies: Arab nationalism and non-Arab Islamic revivalism. Adopting an overtly essentialist position, he argued that more than merely the language of the Qur'an, Arabic provided the only possible linguistic structure within which the Islamic conception of the world could be apprehended. Therefore, he asserted that urubah captured the core of Muslim consciousness, its values and faith – it was inseparable from the identity of all Muslims (al-Faruqi, 1962: 2–30).

He also maintained that urubah was the only context within which the non-Muslim Arabs countries could integrate into their larger societies. Even non-Muslim Arabs, according to al-Faruqi, could identify with urubah expressed in the Qur'an. In effect, urubah left non-Muslim Arabs and non-Arab Muslims at the mercy of combined linguistic and religious essentialisms. Any other form of consciousness and identity was a distortion created by colonial penetration (al-Faruqi, 1962: 211).

Though few would question Arab influence on non-Arab Muslim faith and culture or Arab Muslim influence on non-Muslim Arabs, the implication that they both find their ultimate expression and fulfilment in al-Faruqi's interpretation of Arabism might be regarded by some as an attempt to establish the hegemony of Arab Islam or, more precisely, Arab Muslim culture. Both Arab nationalists and non-Arab Muslim intellectuals shunned al-Faruqi's agenda to bring non-Arab Muslims and non-Muslim Arabs together through urubah. While many Muslim intellectuals such as Fazlur Rahman agreed with al-Faruqi's assertion that the Qur'an could not achieve the same eloquence and expressiveness in any other languages except Arabic, they were critical of al-Faruqi's blatant Arab chauvinism. Al-Faruqi's sojourn in Pakistan did little to alter his doctrine of urubah.

It was in the United States several years later that he began to question the foundations of his earlier position. In 1968, for the first time he encountered members of the Muslim Students' Association (MSA) at Temple University. The convergence of Muslim students from diverse cultural backgrounds dramatically swayed his perception of Arab versus Islamic identity. In the spring of 1968, while a patient at the Johns Hopkins Ophthalmology Centre, al-Faruqi confided in one of the active members of the MSA, Ilyas Ba-Yunus, "Until a few months ago, I was a Palestinian, an Arab, and a Muslim. Now I am a Muslim who happens to be an Arab from Palestine" (Ba-Yunus, 1988: 14).

Scholarly Achievements

Al-Faruqi's early emphasis was on Arabism as the vehicle of Islam and Muslim identity. He was also one of those who proposed the idea of Islamization of knowledge and founded the International Institute of Islamic Thought (IIIT) together with Taha Jabir Alalwani, Abdul Hamid AbuSulayman, former Rector of International Islamic University Malaysia (IIUM), and Anwar Ibrahim, in 1980. 

During his years as a visiting professor of Islamic studies and scholar-in-residence at McGill University, a professor of Islamic studies at Karachi's Central Institute of Islamic Research as well as a visiting professor at various universities in Northern America, he wrote over 100 articles for various scholarly journals and magazines in addition to 25 books, of the most notable being Christian Ethics: A Historical and Systematic Analysis of Its Dominant Ideas. He also established the Islamic Studies Group of the American Academy of Religion and chaired it for ten years. He served as the vice-president of the Inter-Religious Peace Colloqium, The Muslim-Jewish-Christian Conference and as the president of the American Islamic College in Chicago.

Al-Faruqi viewed the existence of Israel as an affront towards Judaism due to its state ideology of Zionism. He said that the injustice caused by Zionism is such as to necessitate war. He proposed a resolution in which Israel is dismantled and its institutions de-Zionised, and that former Israeli Jews who have renounced Zionism would live as an "ummatic community" and move freely throughout the Muslim world:

Death
In May 1986, Al-Faruqi and his wife were murdered in their Pennsylvania home, in a knife attack committed by Joseph Louis Young, who was also known as Yusuf Ali. Young confessed to the crime and was sentenced to the death penalty and died in prison of natural causes in 1996.

Bibliography
A list of publications by Ismail R. al-Faruqi follows.

Books
 (1953) From Here We Start, tr. from the Arabic of K.M. Khalid. Washington, DC: American Council of Learned Societies
 (1953) Our Beginning in Wisdom, tr. from the Arabic of M. al Ghazali. Washington, DC: American Council of Learned Societies
 (1953) The Policy of Tomorrow, tr. from the Arabic of M. B. Ghali. Washington, DC: American Council of Learned Societies
 (1962) `Urubah and Religion: An Analysis of the Dominant Ideas of Arabism and of Islam as Its Heights Moment of Consciousness, vol. 1 of On Arabism, Amsterdam: Djambatan
 (1964) Usul al Sahyuniyah fi al Din al Yahudi (An Analytical Study of the Growth of Particularism in Hebrew Scripture). Cairo: Institute of Higher Arabic Studies
 (1968) Christian Ethics: A Systematic and Historical Analysis of Its Dominant Ideas. Montreal: McGill University Press and Amsterdam: Djambatan, Amsterdam
 (1980) Islam and the Problem of Israel. London: The Islamic Council of Europe 
 (1982) Trialogue of the Abrahamic Faiths, ed. Herndon, VA: IIIT 
 (1982) Islamization of Knowledge. Herndon, VA: IIIT
 (1982) Tawhid: Its Implications for Thought and Life. Kuala Lumpur: IIIT
 (1985) Islam and Other Faiths. Beltsville, MD: Amana Publications
 (1986) The Cultural Atlas of Islam. New York: Macmillan
 (2012) Islam: Religion, Practice, Culture & World Order, London; IIIT (posthumous work updated and edited by Imtiyaz Yusuf)
 (2021) ESSENTIAL WRITINGS ISMAIL AL FARUQI, Selected and Edited by Imtiyaz Yusuf (Kuala Lumpur:IBT Books)
https://ibtbooks.com › shop › essenti...

Translated texts
 Translated by Faruqi into English.

Articles
 "On the Ethics of the Brethren of Purity and Friends of Fidelity (Ikhwan al Safa wa Khillan al Wafa''')", The Muslim World, vol. L, no. 2, pp. 109–21; no. 4, pp. 252–58; vol. LI, no. 1, pp. 18–24
 "On the Significance of Reinhold Niebuhr's Ideas of Society", Canadian Journal of Theology, vol. VII, no. 2, pp. 99–107. Reprinted in Muslim Life, vol. XI, no. 3 (Summer 1964): 5–14

In the press
 An Anthology of Readings on Tawhid. Kuwait: IIFSO
 Training Program for Islamic Youth. Kuwait: IIFSO
 The Life of Muhammad Ibn Abdul Wahhab. Riyadh: The Ministry of Higher Education

References
 Muhammad Shafiq, Growth of Islamic Thought in North America: Focus on Isma'il Raji al Faruqi'', Amana Publications, 1994 
 Imtiyaz Yusuf, Islam and Knowledge: Al Faruqi's Concept of Religion in Islamic Thought London: I. B. Tauris, 2012. Festschrift in honor of Prof. Ismail al-Faruqi.

Notes

External links
 Ismail Faruqi Online A website on the life and works of Dr. Ismail Faruqi
 Every Muslim is a Scientist Clip of Dr. Ismail Faruqi in documentary The Book of Signs (Science in the Quran), which was based on the work of Dr. Maurice Bucaille

American political writers
Palestinian emigrants to the United States

Harvard Graduate School of Arts and Sciences alumni
Al-Azhar University alumni
Temple University faculty
1921 births
1986 deaths
American Muslims
Palestinian academics
People murdered in Pennsylvania
People from Jaffa
Palestinian non-fiction writers
Palestinian philosophers
American murder victims
Deaths by stabbing in Pennsylvania
Palestinian murder victims
Palestinian Muslims
20th-century American non-fiction writers
20th-century American male writers
American male non-fiction writers
20th-century American philosophers
 1986 murders in the United States
Academic staff of McGill University
 University of Chicago faculty
Muslim scholars of Islamic studies